Two Tars is a silent short subject directed by James Parrott starring comedy duo Laurel and Hardy. It was released by Metro-Goldwyn-Mayer on November 3, 1928

Plot
Laurel and Hardy play two sailors on shore leave who decide to rent an automobile. With Laurel at the wheel, he nearly crashes the car into a pedestrian at a street corner. Hardy apologizes for Stan's poor driving, takes the wheel, and shortly thereafter crashes the car into a lamppost. Chagrined, Hardy drives off and parks in front of a drugstore where two young ladies are having difficulty with a street-side vending machine that has taken their penny without giving them a gumball. Hardy tries to shake a gumball from the dispenser but only ends up breaking the glass container, scattering gumballs all over the sidewalk.

Seeing this, the angry proprietor confronts Hardy with Stan joining in, constantly slipping on the scattered gumballs. The girls come to their rescue and rough up the proprietor, accidentally breaking another gumball machine in the process. This action leads to a chain reaction of numerous drivers and passengers battling one another and deliberately damaging their automobiles. Eventually a motorcycle policeman arrives and is told that Stan and Oliver were the instigators of the fracas.

Cast

Production
One of the most elaborate silent comedy shorts, Two Tars was filmed as a three reel (30-minute) comedy originally called Two Tough Tars and edited down to 20 minutes. The opening scenes were shot on Main Street in Culver City, and the car battle scenes were filmed in Santa Monica along what is now Centinela Avenue.

Sons of the Desert
Chapters — called Tents — of The Sons of the Desert, the international Laurel and Hardy Appreciation Society, all take their names from L&H films. There are four Two Tars Tents in Solingen, Germany; Guernsey, Channel Islands; North Illinois/Wisconsin Border; and Philadelphia, Pennsylvania. A fifth Two Tars Tent was established in Reidsville, North Carolina, but is no longer active.

References

External links
 
 
 
 

1928 films
1928 comedy films
American silent short films
American black-and-white films
Films directed by James Parrott
Laurel and Hardy (film series)
Metro-Goldwyn-Mayer short films
Films with screenplays by H. M. Walker
1928 short films
American comedy short films
1920s American films
Silent American comedy films